() are light tie-on sandals, made from (usually straw) ropemaking fibers, that were the standard footwear of the common people in Japan.

Use

 resemble other forms of traditional Japanese footwear, such as zori and geta, with a few key differences. They were historically the simplest form of outdoor footwear (sandals of any type were not worn indoors). , due to their cheap and rustic nature, are considered to be a very informal type of footwear, and are not worn with formal kimono. They are typically not worn with  socks, and are woven so that the wearer's toes generally protrude slightly over the edge of the shoe.

 were once common footwear in Japan. In the Edo period (1603–1867 CE), geta were worn in cities, but anyone making a long journey wore . They were also worn for energetic or prolonged labour. Their light weight and grip were valued.

In modern-day Japan,  are worn by Buddhist monks, and by some fishers of mountain streams. Zori and geta are worn far more commonly by the general population.

Construction

In constant use, rice-straw  only last three or four days, or roughly 24 hours of active use and so people would have to make about a hundred pairs a year, on average, if they wore them constantly. As  could be homemade from cheap materials, and many people learned how to make them in childhood, that was not a problem.  could also be cheaply bought. Travellers carried a supply and discarded them when they were worn out.

Materials

Rice straw is the common and traditional material for weaving . Long straw (not broken by the processing methods) must be beaten to soften the fibers before use. Most other ropemaking fibers can also be used, such as cotton, hemp, palm fibers, or even strips of rag. The straps of the  might be covered, often with paper. Cardboard soles are used on some modern commercial designs.

Tying

There are a number of different ways of tying  straps; even historically, there was no standardised method of attaching the shoes to one's feet.

Ceremonial use

Traditionally,  were donated to temples as offerings for healthy feet and protection on journeys. This practice, while now less common, is still followed. More modernly, giant  kept in temples are touched as a charm for tireless endurance in walking.

See also

Geta, traditional Japanese wooden clogs
Zori, traditional Japanese sandals
, traditional Japanese wooden platform clogs
, traditional Japanese split-toe socks
, traditional Japanese split-toe workboots
Bast shoe, similar Northern European shoe
 Huarache (shoe), traditional Mexican sandals constructed from woven strips of leather

Notes

References

External links

Sandals
Folk footwear
Samurai clothing
Japanese footwear
Straw objects
Weaving
Japanese words and phrases